Colonial Dame could refer to:

 Colonial Dames of America, based in New York
 The National Society of the Colonial Dames of America, based in Pennsylvania

See also

 Daughters of the American Revolution